Plastic Hearts is the seventh studio album by American singer Miley Cyrus. It was released on November 27, 2020, by RCA Records, and was her final album with the label; she signed with Columbia Records in early 2021. Marking a departure from Cyrus' previous releases, Plastic Hearts is primarily a rock, pop, synth-pop, and glam rock record, with influences from country, punk rock, new wave, arena rock, industrial, disco, and power pop. Most of the album was produced by Andrew Watt and Louis Bell, with further collaboration with Mark Ronson and Andrew Wyatt. Guest vocals include Dua Lipa, Billy Idol, Joan Jett and Stevie Nicks.

Plastic Hearts debuted at number one on the US Billboard Top Rock Albums chart and number two on the Billboard 200 and received positive reviews from music critics. Three singles were released from the album, "Midnight Sky", "Prisoner", and "Angels like You".

Background

Feeling distant from the mainstream urban culture she explored on Bangerz (2013) and the musical experimentalism of Miley Cyrus & Her Dead Petz (2015), Cyrus decided to go for "rootsy" country music elements while making her sixth studio album Younger Now (2017). The album was released on September 29, 2017, to lukewarm critical and commercial performance. It received an average score of 75 out of 100 on Metacritic, and charted at number five on the US Billboard 200 with first-week sales of 60,000 copies and 66,000 overall album-equivalent units. Its lead single "Malibu" became her ninth top-ten single on the US Billboard Hot 100, while the title track peaked at number 79. Cyrus confirmed there would be no further singles only one month after the album was released and that she would not be touring for it.

Two weeks prior to Younger Now being released, Cyrus claimed that she was "over [the album]" and was "already two songs deep on the next one"; however, she later said that she began working on the album in early 2018. In December 2019, Cyrus acknowledged that the musical direction of Younger Now "wasn't exactly the home for [her]" and credited Ronson with "[helping her] carve out [her] sound, where [she] could do everything that [she wanted], which is more modern." Cyrus later cited Britney Spears and Metallica as musical influences on the album.

Development and release

In November 2018, Cyrus announced she was collaborating with Ronson, and continued work on her forthcoming record. Cyrus and Ronson told Matt Wilkinson of Beats 1 that they were "80% done" with their albums, and tentatively planned for Cyrus' project to be released in June 2019.

Cyrus held a private listening session of the album for iHeartRadio executives upon announcing its completion in May. On May 9, Cyrus announced on social media she would be releasing new music on May 30, and later stated the rollout of her new music would be "unconventional". On May 31, Cyrus tweeted that the album would be titled She Is Miley Cyrus, and that it would be preceded by three six-track extended plays: She Is Coming on May 31, She Is Here in the summer, and She Is Everything in the fall. Cyrus described the three EPs as "different [chapters] to a trilogy" that together would form the full-length album. Their track listings were to be "seasonal" in nature; she related She Is Coming to "[wanting to feel] light and feel the warmth" of early summer, and She Is Here and She Is Everything to being "colder and a little darker" as the release cycle was to extend into the fall. She Is Here was inspired by "the present of where [Cyrus is] at", while She Is Everything was to be comparatively more ballad-driven. She later explained that the "she" pronoun in the album title described the "most confident version of herself".

Cyrus continued work on the record following her separation from then-husband Liam Hemsworth in August. The following month, it was reported that Cyrus was undecided between updating the existing album that was completed before her divorce or scrapping that version of the record altogether. On October 20, it was speculated from Cyrus' Instagram Live video that the release date for the full-length album was scheduled for her birthday on November 23, 2019. On November 3, Ronson stated that Cyrus' collaborations with him were tentatively planned to be released before the end of that year. On November 9, however, it was reported that Cyrus' new music would be delayed until early 2020 due to her vocal cord surgery earlier that month.

On New Year's Day 2020, Cyrus uploaded a highlight video of the past decade and announced that "[the] new era starts now". She stated "[she was] getting super close [and was] feeling the urgency" during an interview with DJ Smallzy on March 4. She posted a clip of the music video for her song "Start All Over" with the hashtags "#sheiscoming" and "#butforrealthistime" on August 4. With the release of the single "Midnight Sky" on August 14, Cyrus confirmed the cancellation of the She Is Here and She Is Everything EPs, citing that "this year has been extremely unexpected [and] I guess I was feeling like it didn't make sense for me to continue the next two projects." She stated she did not have plans to release the full-length album in the near future because "when you write a record, a lot of the time, you're writing your experiences, and then by the time the record comes out, you've evolved past that experience" whereas releasing standalone singles "allows you to talk to your fans in real time". She later claimed she would wait until she could tour again to release the record, however the album was later reported to be released in November. On October 23, Cyrus announced the album's new title to be Plastic Hearts and that it would be released on November 27; it became available for preorder that day.

Artwork
The album artwork for Plastic Hearts was photographed by Mick Rock, who is widely known for his work with artists including Joan Jett and Debbie Harry. It was the last album cover taken by Rock who died in 2021. The standard cover applies a pink filter to Cyrus' image, while limited edition copies from Cyrus' website feature black-and-white and full color variants. Cyrus is pictured on the cover with a blonde mullet, wearing a Jean Paul Gaultier sleeveless black-and-white shirt with the word "censored" printed on it, and accessorized with silver jewelry.

Composition

Influences 
In terms of musical influence, Cyrus described the album as "[having] kind of everything". She later explained that she considers her to be "genderless" and a "mosaic of all the things [she's] been in before "Vanity Fair''''. She compared her work to Ronson for "rocked, modern Debbie Harry or Joan Jett ", while her respective collaborations with Mike Will Made It and Wyatt brought elements of hip hop and alternative pop. In September 2020, the singer cited the heavy metal band Metallica and pop princess Britney Spears as influences for the album.

Music and lyricsPlastic Hearts opening track "WTF Do I Know" was described by British Vogue as "a galloping rock stomper that recalls the stop-start rhythm of The Strokes with a tinge of glam rock", with People magazine describing its lyrics as "Cyrus singing about the uncertainty of life and is a clear nod to Hemsworth, 30, who she split from last year." Cyrus stated the song is "not that it's how I feel every second of the day, it's how I felt for a moment". The title track "Plastic Hearts" "opts for a more jam-orientated rock flavour, slowly blooming out of a piano and percussion intro". "Angels like You", the album's third track, was compared by British Vogue to Cyrus' 2013 single "Wrecking Ball", where "Cyrus glides between fragile heartbreak ("Won't call me by name, only baby") in the verses, to a full-throated roar of defiance on the sky-scraping chorus ("I know that you're wrong for me, gonna wish we never met on the day I leave"), with Cosmopolitan referring to Cyrus' 2019 relationship with Kaitlynn Carter as the song's lyrical inspiration.

Second single "Prisoner" was described by NME as a "heartache anthem" and "is a glam declaration of independence". The theme of independence is shared with "Midnight Sky", in which Cyrus is said to be "tak[ing] back her narrative" and being confident in herself. Fifth track "Gimme What I Want" shows industrial influences and reflects on the singer's choice of giving herself to someone else but if they don't want it, she'd be alright by herself. The track received many comparisons to Nine Inch Nails.

Eighth track "High", co-produced by Mark Ronson and co-written with Caitlyn Smith, is a country ballad that "channels the rustic, singsong around the campfire varnished hurt of the A Star Is Born soundtrack". "Hate Me" is a bittersweet song that shows Cyrus making the blame for busted romance. The track has also been interpreted as a response to the negative press about Cyrus and a reflection on how the media attention surrounding her would suddenly become positive if she died.

Tenth track "Bad Karma" features Joan Jett on vocals and Angel Olsen on guitar. It is a high-camp panto of '80s hard rock, which finds Cyrus and Jett trading one-liners over one of the record's few live drum tracks with the singer lightly playing with her own self-image ("I've always picked a giver 'cause I've always been the taker"). "Never Be Me" was compared to a ballad from the 1980s and "over a bubbling synth pulse, Cyrus lays out what she will and won't do vis-à-vis new relationships. So, "If you're looking for faithful, that'll never be me" later morphs into the climactic, heart-bursting, "If you think that I'm someone to give up and leave, that'll never be me".

Closing track "Golden G String", classified by many critics as the most complex, according to Cyrus, is "reflective of Donald Trump as president and the men hold all the cards -- and they ain't playing gin, and they determine your fate." Co-written only with its producer Andrew Wyatt, the track also sees Cyrus reflecting about her mid-2010s antics on lines like "I was tryin' to own my power/Still I'm tryin' to work it out/And at least it gives the paper somethin' they can write about".

Promotion
Live performances
Cyrus performed "Angels like You", "High", "Plastic Hearts" and "Golden G String" for an exclusive Backyard Sessions released on November 27, along her album on Apple Music. She then performed "Plastic Hearts", "Midnight Sky", and "Prisoner" on the first episode of the Amazon Music Holiday Plays digital concert series on December 1, 2020. She sang "Golden G String" at NPR's Tiny Desk Concert on January 28, 2021. The singer performed "Angels like You" for a special Rehearsal - Behind the Scenes YouTube video, of her Pre Super Bowl Show, on February 3, 2021. She gave a performance consisting of the tracks "Plastic Hearts", "Midnight Sky", "Prisoner", "High", "Angels like You", "Bad Karma" and "Night Crawling" during the TikTok Tailgate pre-game concert before Super Bowl LV in Tampa, Florida on February 7, 2021. The singer performed "Plastic Hearts" at Saturday Night Live on May 8, 2021. "Hate Me" and "Gimme What I Want" was performed next on June 10, 2021, on Magnum's 8D Special Performance. Cyrus performed "Plastic Hearts", "Midnight Sky", at Resort Las Vegas Grand Opening on July 4, 2021. On July 29, she sang "Midnight Sky", "Angels Like You", "WTF Do I Know", and "Night Crawling" at the Lollapalooza festival.

Singles
Plastic Hearts was made available for pre-order on October 24, 2020, with three songs available to download. These were lead single "Midnight Sky", live covers of "Heart of Glass" (originally released September 29, 2020) and "Zombie". "Edge of Midnight (Midnight Sky Remix)", a mash-up of "Midnight Sky" with Stevie Nicks' song "Edge of Seventeen" was released as the fourth pre-release download on November 6, 2020.

"Prisoner", featuring Dua Lipa, was released as the album's second single on November 19, 2020. The music video was released the same day. A remix of the song was released later on.

"Angels like You" was released as the third single from the album. The music video for the song was released on March 8, 2021, was co-directed by Cyrus and Alana O'Herlihy and contains footage taken from singer's Super Bowl pre-game performance on February 7, 2021. Sony Music serviced it to contemporary hit radio stations in Australia on March 12. British radio station BBC Radio 1 added "Angels like You" to rotation on March 20, and the record label sent it to contemporary hit stations in Italy on April 9, 2021.

Critical reception

At Metacritic, which assigns a normalized rating out of 100 to reviews from mainstream critics, the album has an average score of 75 based on 22 reviews, indicating "generally favorable reviews".

Katie Tymochenko of Exclaim! described Plastic Hearts as "Cyrus' gateway into the world of rock", but stated that "although she's proven herself to be a musical chameleon throughout all aspects of her career, Cyrus still caters to her pop following that's been with her since day one". El Hunt of NME said that Cyrus was reflecting her Black Mirror character Ashley O in her transition from teen pop star to rock star, and complimented the "glam-rock tendencies" of "Prisoner" and "industrial undercurrent" of "Gimme What I Want". Elly Watson of DIY praised her new musical direction saying "Overall, Miley's seventh era seems to be the one that suits her best". Bella Fleming of The Line of Best Fit also praised Cyrus' new found independence and passion, saying "with Plastic Hearts, comes a wonderful album about life as a fiercely independent woman. Cyrus has found the perfect balance of pushing her own musical boundaries whilst proving she's one of the strongest and bravest names in the constant celebrity whirlwind."

Reviewing the album for AllMusic, Heather Phares claimed the album to be both "Passionate and self-aware" and that it is "easily the finest incarnation of Cyrus' music yet." Claire Shaffer of Rolling Stone called the album a "karaoke night out that ends up being something more substantial" and pointed that Cyrus "knows exactly what kind of leather-jacket-and-combat-boot show she's putting on here, and her full embrace of rock at its most bombastic, artificial, hair-metal glory is refreshing to say the least". In a positive review, Shaad D'Souza from Pitchfork defined Plastic Hearts as a "genuinely pleasing, though sometimes hamfisted record that staves off the awkwardness and missteps that plagued her previous albums" and said the album's greatest success is that "for the first time in a long time, a Miley Cyrus record is music first, headlines second".

Year-end lists

Commercial performance
The album was a commercial success, although in the United States, physical copies of Plastic Hearts were unavailable on the release date due to major retailers' stock limitations of physical music in anticipation of Black Friday, on which the release date fell. Cyrus stated that she and her team had not been informed of these expected distribution disruptions when selecting "the suggested [November 27] date", adding that she was "equally/if not more frustrated" than her fans. Nevertheless, the album debuted at number two on the US Billboard 200 with 60,000 album-equivalent units, making it her ninth release to chart within the top five and her highest-charting release since Bangerz (2013). During its second week of release, Plastic Hearts dropped to number 12 with sales of 37,500 copies, and dropped to number 20 in its third week after moving 31,000 units. Additionally, the album became Cyrus' first entry and chart-topper on the Billboard Top Rock Albums chart, with seven of its songs entering the Hot Rock & Alternative Songs chart. According to weekly chart data from the Rolling Stone Top 200, Plastic Hearts has moved over 406,000 units in the US since release, as of May 2021. As of February 2023, Plastic Hearts has been streamed over 2.2 billion times on Spotify, which makes it the 8th most streamed female album of 2020 on the platform.

Plastic Hearts debuted at number four on the UK Albums Chart, with sales of 15,318 units. In Canada, the album debuted atop the Canadian Albums Chart, making it her fourth number-one and ninth top-ten album on the chart.

 Impact 
With Plastic Hearts, Cyrus was pointed as one of the top artists who led the commercial ressurgence of rock music in 2020–2021. American independent newspaper The Diamondback pointed Cyrus alongside Post Malone as the main current artists who "helped to rebrand rock", stating that she "could very well become the female face of a rock revival". Consequence Of Sound cited Plastic Hearts as a " big pivot to rock in the pop world" along with Poppy's I Disagree. In 2020, close to the album's release, British rock magazine Kerrang! published an article called "Is Pop going Metal?" on which they stated: "Miley Cyrus going rock will bring in legions of new fans to our scene". One year later, the aforementioned magazine cited Cyrus as one of the names who are "offering hope that rock music is slowly-but-surely returning to the centre of popular culture". MTV pointed Plastic Hearts as one of the main responsible for the return of nostalgia in pop culture, adding that with the record Cyrus "completely reinvented herself as a glam-rock icon, diving into the past as she cleared a path forward in the pop-rock sphere". Upon its release, The New York Times wrote that with Plastic Hearts "rock music has found its most earnest and high-profile millennial ambassador", adding: "Maybe rock's not dead — it's just in the capable hands of Miley Cyrus".

Track listingNotes  indicates an additional producer

Personnel
Credits adapted from Tidal.Musicians Miley Cyrus – vocals, background vocals
 Andrew Watt – background vocals , bass guitar , drums , guitar , percussion , keyboards , piano , programming 
 Louis Bell – keyboards , programming , piano 
 Chad Smith – drums and percussion 
 Will Malone – strings 
 Dua Lipa – vocals and background vocals 
 Jon Bellion – background vocals 
 Michael Pollack – background vocals , keyboards 
 The Monsters & Strangerz – background vocals and keyboards 
 Majid Jordan – background vocals 
 Paul Lamalfa – programming 
 Ali Tamposi – background vocals 
 Billy Idol – vocals and background vocals 
 Taylor Hawkins – drums 
 Happy Perez – keyboards and programming 
 Ilsey Juber – background vocals 
 Jennifer Decilveo – acoustic guitar 
 Leo Abrahams – acoustic and electric guitar 
 Mark Ronson – keyboards , percussion , programming , synthesizer , guitar 
 Take a Daytrip – keyboards and programming 
 Riccardo Damian – programming 
 Andrew Wyatt – keyboards , strings 
 Ben Lester – steel guitar 
 Joan Jett – vocals and background vocals 
 Homer Steinweiss – drums 
 Angel Olsen – guitar 
 The Picard Brothers – programming , synthesizer 
 John Carroll Kirby – synthesizer 
 Brandon Bost – keyboards , programming 
 Teo Halm – keyboards 
 Justin Cantor – cello 
 Emile Haynie – programming 
 Mario Gotoh – viola 
 Christina Liberis – violin 
 Marc Szammer – violin 
 Joe Ayoub – bass guitar 
 Stacy Jones – drums 
 Jamie Arentzen – guitar 
 Max Bernstein – guitar 
 Mike Schmid – keyboards 
 Josh Moreau – bass guitar 
 Jaco Caraco – guitar Technical'''

 Mark "Spike" Stent – mixing engineer 
 Şerban Ghenea – mixing engineer 
 Tom Elmhirst – mixing engineer 
 Brandon Bost – mixing engineer , engineer 
 Paul David Hager – mixing engineer 
 Randy Merrill – mastering engineer 
 Paul Lamalfa – mastering engineer , engineer , recording engineer , vocal engineer 
 Geoff Swan – engineer 
 Louis Bell – engineer 
 Michael Freeman – engineer 
 Andrew Dudman – engineer 
 Ryan Carline – engineer 
 John Hanes – engineer , assistant engineer 
 Jacob Munk – engineer 
 Todd Monfalcone – engineer , assistant engineer 
 Andrew Wyatt – engineer , recording engineer 
 Riccardo Damian – recording engineer , engineer 
 Lizzie Arnold – assistant engineer 
 Tileyard – assistant engineer 
 Matthew Scatchell – assistant engineer 
 Tyler Beans – assistant engineer

Charts

Weekly charts

Year-end charts

Certifications

Release history

References

2020 albums
Albums postponed due to the COVID-19 pandemic
Albums produced by Andrew Watt (record producer)
Albums produced by Andrew Wyatt
Albums produced by Louis Bell
Albums produced by Mark Ronson
Albums produced by Mike Will Made It
Glam rock albums by American artists
Miley Cyrus albums
RCA Records albums
Synth-pop albums by American artists
Albums produced by Take a Daytrip
Albums produced by Emile Haynie